The rufous-browed chat-tyrant (Ochthoeca superciliosa) is a species of bird in the family Tyrannidae. It is found in Venezuela.

Its natural habitats are subtropical or tropical moist montane forests, subtropical or tropical high-altitude grassland, and heavily degraded former forest.

References

Ochthoeca
Birds of Venezuela
Birds described in 1871
Taxa named by Philip Sclater
Taxa named by Osbert Salvin